Tomtebo is a residential area in Umeå, Sweden. It is located next to the lake Nydalasjön.

Tomtebo was counted as a separate locality between 2000 and 2005, and had 633 inhabitants in 2005.

References

External links
Tomtebo at Umeå Municipality

Umeå